Andrew Crumey (born 1961) is a novelist and former literary editor of the Edinburgh newspaper Scotland on Sunday.

Life and career
Crumey was born in Glasgow, Scotland, and grew up in Kirkintilloch. He graduated with First Class Honours from the University of St Andrews and holds a PhD in theoretical physics from Imperial College, London. His thesis was on integrable systems and Kac-Moody algebras, supervised by David Olive and completed in 1988.

Crumey's first novel, Music, in a Foreign Language, won the Saltire Society First Book Award in 1994. Its theme of alternate history was inspired by the many-worlds intepretation of quantum mechanics.

His second novel Pfitz was a New York Times "Notable Book of the Year" in 1997, described as "cerebral but warm and likeable". The sequel, D'Alembert's Principle took its title from a principle of physics.

Crumey was a regular book reviewer for Scotland on Sunday from 1996 and became the newspaper's literary editor in 2000.

In 2000 Crumey's fourth novel Mr Mee was longlisted for the Man Booker Prize and won the Scottish Arts Council Book Award. He followed it with Mobius Dick, described by Joseph O'Connor as "perhaps the only novel about quantum mechanics you could imagine reading while lying on a beach."

In 2003 Crumey was selected for Granta's "Best of Young British Novelists", but had been incorrectly submitted by publisher Picador, being over 40 at the time.

In 2006, Crumey became the fifth recipient of the Northern Rock Foundation Writer's Award for Sputnik Caledonia, which was also shortlisted for the James Tait Black Memorial Prize and Scottish Book of the Year.

In 2011 he was a visiting fellow at Durham Institute of Advanced Study,  then became lecturer in creative writing at Northumbria University.

He has an interest in astronomy and in 2014 he published on the subject of astronomic visibility and Ricco's law.

His short story Singularity was broadcast on Radio 4 in 2016 and later published in The Great Chain of Unbeing.

In 2017 he was a contestant in the St Andrews team on BBC Two's Christmas University Challenge.

In 2018 The Great Chain of Unbeing was shortlisted for the Saltire Fiction Award. Adam Roberts wrote in Literary Review: 'Andrew Crumey’s new book is a quasi-novel built out of connected short stories. It’s something for which we English have no specific term, but for which German critics have probably coined an impressively resonant piece of nomenclature (Kurzgeschichtenverkettung, maybe?). It’s as good an example of the form as I know.'

Critical Reception

Cultural theorist Sonia Front writes, "The notion of parallel universes seems to be Andrew Crumey's favourite physical theory... His writings can be seen as a multiverse themselves, with the characters reappearing to live an alternative world-line in another novel... Some of Crumey's novels embrace metalepsis, that is, breaching diegetic levels."

Commenting on the story "The Last Midgie on Earth" in The Great Chain of Unbeing, Milena Kalicanin writes, "Scotland becomes Crumey's synonym for a postmodern utopia that he symbolically defines as a state of mind, a land of spiritual freedom in which everybody says an everlasting 'yes' to life, and a profound 'no' to the postmodern capitalist system of values."

Lisa Harrison compares Crumey's Sputnik Caledonia with  Matthew Fitt's But'n'Ben A-Go-Go. "Their fictive worlds are Scotland, though not as we know it - they each present a Scotland stripped of stereotyping, thus reformed and redefined through fiction." 

Timothy C. Baker comments on the use of Gothic tropes such as found manuscripts in the work of Crumey and other Scottish writers. "Use of such tropes can be limiting... In other texts, however, including  Gray's Poor Things, Crumey's Mr Mee, and A. L. Kennedy's So I Am Glad, each of which embeds Gothic elements in another genre or mode, the trope exceeds these limitations and allows for a greater reflection on the relationship between language and experience."

Commenting on unorthodox approaches to genre fiction by writers such as Frank Kuppner and Ken Macleod, the Cambridge Companion to British Fiction Since 1945 says "Andrew Crumey is one of the most innovative and engaging Scottish writers to emerge out of this context in the last twenty years. His speculative fiction has a strong European and global dimension, drawing on the influence of Borges, Calvino and Milorad Pavic in its intricate, nested narratives, non-linearity, and ludic encyclopaedism - evident, for example, in Pftiz (1995) and D'Alembert's Principle (1996)."

Mark C. Taylor related the multiple "authors" in Pfitz to complexity theory. "Pfitz is not just about emergent complexity but is a brilliant enactment of it. One of the strategies Crumey and his coauthors use to generate complexity is to create multiple self-reflexive loops by folding authors and readers into each other until the line separating them becomes obscure."

Works 
Music in a Foreign Language (1994)
Pfitz (1995)
D’Alembert’s Principle (1996)
Mr Mee (2000)
Mobius Dick (2004)
Sputnik Caledonia (2008)
The Secret Knowledge (2013)
The Great Chain of Unbeing (2018)
Beethoven's Assassins (2023)

See also

 List of comic and cartoon characters named after people
 List of fiction employing parallel universes

References

External links 
 Andrew Crumey's webpage (author site)
 Andrew Crumey's webpage (Northumbria University)
 Goodreads.com

Living people
1961 births
Scottish novelists
People from Kirkintilloch
Postmodern writers
British literary editors
People educated at Kirkintilloch High School
Alumni of the University of St Andrews